The 2014 Pan American Women's Youth Handball Championship took place in Fortaleza from April 22 – 26. It acts as the Pan American qualifying tournament for the 2014 Women's Youth World Handball Championship and 2014 Youth Olympic Games.

Results

Final standing

References 
 brasilhandebol.com.br

2014 in handball
Pan American Women's Youth Handball Championship
2014 in youth sport